Opera is a Western performance art which combines music and drama.

Opera may also refer to:

In arts and entertainment

Art forms
Chinese opera, an art form combining music and drama rooted in traditional Chinese culture
Opéra comique, a French opera genre
List of opera genres, opera's many different forms

In music  
 Opera (band), an Italian pop-rock band active between 1975 and 1985

Albums
Opera (Andrea Bocelli album)
Opera (Tosca album), 1997
Ópera, 1991 album by Todmobile

Songs
"Opera" (Çetin Alp song), 1983
"Opera" (Super Junior song), 2012
"The Opera", a song from the musical Natasha, Pierre & The Great Comet of 1812

Opera companies and venues
Opera Comique, London theatre (1870–1902), known for Gilbert and Sullivan operas
Opéra-Comique, Paris opera company and opera house
Opera house, a theatre building used for opera performances
Opéra, a commonly used name for the Paris Opera

Magazines

Opera (British magazine), a British publication covering opera
Opera (Japanese magazine), a Japanese manga magazine

Other uses in arts and entertainment
Opera (1987 film), a horror film by Dario Argento
Opera (2020 film), a South Korean/American animated short film
"Opera" (The Super Mario Bros. Super Show!), a 1989 live-action episode of the TV series
"The Opera" (Seinfeld), a 1992 episode of the TV series

Businesses 
Opera (fabrica ecclesiae), non profit foundations for the maintenance of churches and religious buildings in Italy
Opera, a Japanese adult video studio founded by Kaoru Toyoda

Places 
Opera (Budapest Metro), a station of the Millennium Underground line of the Budapest Metro
Opéra (Paris Métro), a station of the Paris rapid transit system
Opera, Lombardy, a municipality in the province of Milan, Italy

In science and technology 
 Opera (web browser) and Opera Software, the Norwegian software company behind it
 OPERA experiment, a particle-physics experiment aiming to detect neutrino oscillations
 OPERA, a property-management system for hotels, developed and marketed by MICROS Systems, Inc.

Other uses 
 OPERA, one of the five words in the first-century Latin word square, the Sator Square
MSC Opera, a cruise ship
Opera cake, a type of French cake
Operation Opera, a 1981 Israeli air strike
Opera publica, construction or engineering projects carried out in ancient Rome

See also 
Horse opera, melodramatic, formulaic Western movie or TV series 
Opus (disambiguation)
Rock opera, a rock album or performance in which the songs form a cohesive story
Soap opera (disambiguation)
Space Opera (disambiguation)